Morningside Drive may refer to:
 Morningside Drive (Manhattan), a street in New York City
 Morningside Drive (band), a 1970s disco band